Oak Lodge School is a specialist day school with a residential provision for students with hearing, speech, language and communication needs aged 10–19. It is located in the London borough of Wandsworth in England.

Oak Lodge School also hosts other services, such as Life Long Learning (for education of deaf adults) and a Sixth Form (providing support to deaf students who are educated at nearby colleges and on-site).

The school currently has more than 80 pupils from 25 different boroughs and was graded good in February 2019. A residential provision is also available for a small number of children to stay in the school's hostel during the week. Phoenix House was judged to be outstanding by Ofsted in March 2020.

Ofsted Inspection

Ofsted, the UK Government's Office for Standards in Education, inspected the school and rated it as an "exceptional school."  In its report, it stated that teaching and care of pupils and the premises are outstanding.

References

External links
 http://www.oaklodge.wandsworth.sch.uk

Special schools in the London Borough of Wandsworth
Educational institutions established in 1905
1905 establishments in England
Community schools in the London Borough of Wandsworth
Balham